Verkhny Tykhtem (Ürge Tiktäm) is a rural locality (a village) in Kelteyevsky Selsoviet, Kaltasinsky District, Bashkortostan, Russia. The population was 258 as of 2010. There are 4 streets.

Geography 
Verkhny Tykhtem is located 12 km west of Kaltasy (the district's administrative centre) by road. Nizhny Tykhtem is the nearest rural locality.

References 

Rural localities in Kaltasinsky District
Ufa Governorate